Wallasey is a town in the Metropolitan Borough of Wirral, Merseyside, England; until 1974, it was part of the historic county of Cheshire. It is at the mouth of the River Mersey, on the north-eastern corner of the Wirral Peninsula. At the 2011 Census, the population was 60,284.

History

Toponymy
The name of Wallasey originates from the Germanic word Walha, meaning a Briton, a Welshman, which is also the origin of the name Wales. The suffix “-ey” denotes an island or area of dry land. Originally the higher ground now occupied by Wallasey was separated from the rest of Wirral by the creek known as Wallasey Pool (which later became the docks), the marshy areas of Bidston Moss and Leasowe, and sand dunes along the coast.

Early history

Within the boundaries of the historic county of Cheshire, the area was sparsely populated before the 19th century. Horse races organised for the Earls of Derby on the sands at Leasowe in the 16th and 17th centuries are regarded as forerunners of the modern Derby.

Old maps show that the main centre and parish church (St Hilary's) were located at what is now called Wallasey Village, and there were smaller hamlets at Liscard, Poulton and Seacombe, from where there were occasional ferries across the Mersey. There was also a mill (at Mill Lane), and from the mid-18th century a gunpowder store or magazine at Rock Point, located well away from the built-up areas. 

The main activities in the area were farming and fishing. The area also had a reputation for smuggling and “wrecking”, the act of luring ships onto rocks or sandbanks with false lights in order to raid their cargo. Underground cellars and tunnels, which were used to hide cargo pilfered from wrecked ships still exist in the town. As late as 1839, the “Pennsylvania” and two other ships were wrecked off Leasowe in a severe storm, and their cargoes and furnishings were later found distributed among local residents.

Early 19th-century development
By the early 19th century, the shoreline between Seacombe and Rock Point started to become an attractive area to which affluent Liverpool merchants and sea captains could retire.  Development at Egremont began around this time, and gained pace with the introduction of steam ferries across the river. The area also had a defensive role overlooking the growing Port of Liverpool. In 1829, Fort Perch Rock was built, and in 1858 Liscard Battery.

In 1835 Liscard Hall was built by another merchant, Sir John Tobin. Its grounds later became Central Park. His family also developed a “model farm” nearby.

With the expansion of trade on the Mersey, new docks were constructed between 1842 and 1847 in the Wallasey Pool, and by 1877 the dock system between Wallasey and neighbouring Birkenhead was largely complete. The area around the docks became a centre for engineering industries, many associated with shipbuilding, and other activities including sugar refining and the manufacture of cement and fertilisers. Bidston Dock, the last in the area, was opened in 1933, but was filled in during 2003.

Later growth and the 20th century
During the latter half of the 19th century New Brighton developed as a popular seaside resort serving Liverpool and the Lancashire industrial towns, and many of the large houses were converted to inexpensive hotels. A pier was opened in the 1860s, and the promenade from Seacombe to New Brighton was built in the 1890s.  This served both as a recreational amenity in its own right, and to link up the developments along the estuary, and was later extended westwards towards Leasowe. The New Brighton Tower, the tallest in the country, was opened in 1900 but closed in 1919 and dismantled shortly afterwards. However, its ballroom continued as a major venue, hosting numerous concerts in the 1950s and 1960s by local Liverpool bands as well as other international stars. 

After 1886, with the opening of the Mersey Railway allowing access via a tunnel to Liverpool, the pace of housing development increased, particularly in the Liscard and Wallasey Village areas.  The area now called Wallasey comprises several distinct districts which gradually merged to form a single built-up area during the 19th and early 20th centuries.  Further growth continued well into the 20th century and eventually spread into the Leasowe area and beyond to Moreton.

The UK's first guide dog training school, the Guide Dogs for the Blind Association, was founded in the town in 1931. A statue sits outside the Floral Pavilion Theatre to celebrate this.

The Wallasey Golf Club is where club member, Dr Frank Stableford, developed the Stableford system of points scoring. This was first used in competition in 1932.

Because of its docks and proximity to Liverpool, parts of the area suffered aerial bombing in 1940–41. After the Second World War, the popularity of New Brighton as a seaside resort declined dramatically, as did the use of the docks, and Wallasey gradually became more obviously a residential suburb for Liverpool, Birkenhead and the other towns in the area.

The Beatles played some of their first shows outside Liverpool at the Grosvenor Ballroom in Liscard in 1960, and over the next few years also played several times at the Tower Ballroom in New Brighton.  On 12 October 1962, they played there as the support act for Little Richard. Wallasey was also the home base of two other leading Merseybeat groups, the Undertakers featuring Jackie Lomax, and the Pressmen featuring Ritchie Prescott and Phil Kenzie who later became a successful saxophone soloist.

The world's first passenger hovercraft service operated from July 1962 to September 1962 between Leasowe and Rhyl in North Wales. Local MP Ernest Marples was responsible as Minister of Transport (1959–64) for introducing parking meters, yellow lines and seat belt controls to the UK.

The "Solar Campus" on Leasowe Road was the first building in the world to be heated entirely by solar energy.  It was formerly St George's Secondary School, and was built in 1961 to the designs of Emslie Morgan. The solar panels on this establishment have since been removed due to high costs and has been renamed.

Wallasey was struck by an F1/T3 tornado on 23 November 1981, as part of the record-breaking nationwide tornado outbreak on that day.

Civic history

Wallasey became a County Borough in 1913, and its town hall was officially opened in November 1920. The borough boundaries expanded to include Moreton and Saughall Massie in 1928.

The County Borough of Wallasey was incorporated into the Metropolitan Borough of Wirral on 1 April 1974. The town is contained in the parliamentary constituency of Wallasey, which has been held since the 1992 general election by Angela Eagle of the Labour Party.

Geography
Wallasey is situated at the north-east of the Wirral Peninsula, on the western side of the River Mersey and adjoining the Irish Sea.

The area now called Wallasey comprises several distinct districts - Egremont, Liscard, New Brighton, Poulton, Seacombe and Wallasey Village. These gradually merged to form a single built-up area during the 19th and early 20th centuries. 

Unlike in most other towns, there is no single Wallasey town centre, although the main shopping area is centrally located at Liscard. Both the parliamentary constituency and the former County Borough of Wallasey also include (or included) Leasowe, Moreton and Saughall Massie, which are now usually regarded as separate settlements.

The town forms part of the wider Birkenhead Urban Area, which in 2011 had a population of 325,000.

Liscard 

This contains the main shopping area, with the covered Cherry Tree precinct and an extensive shopping parade outside. Central Park, originally the grounds of Liscard Hall, is the largest park in the town. Much of the area is residential and contains mainly high-density semi-detached housing with some terraces. The gatehouse of the old Liscard Battery remains.

Liscard Hall was destroyed by a fire on 7 July 2008. The damage was so severe, the whole building had to be demolished.

Wallasey Village 

Wallasey Village has a mixture of mostly 20th century semi-detached and detached housing, a shopping street, with a floral roundabout in the centre. St Hilary's Church is an ancient foundation; the old tower is all that remains of a 1530 church building which burned down in 1857. There are two railway stations, Wallasey Village and Wallasey Grove Road. At the north end of Wallasey Village, the main street leads to the promenade and coastal park, and two golf courses.

New Brighton 

New Brighton was a popular seaside resort after the mid-19th century, but declined in popularity after the 1950s. Nevertheless, the marine promenade is part of a walkway and the areas near the sea offer a much improved beach and many leisure activities. The Floral Pavilion plays host to regular productions and national stars such as Ken Dodd, and Vale Park is a public park. Housing here ranges from large villas near the sea to suburban semi-detached homes, and some terraces in parts of the area. New Brighton is served by a railway station of the same name.

Poulton 

Poulton was originally a small fishing and farming hamlet beside the Wallasey Pool (hence its name). It developed with the growth of the docks, mainly as an industrial and terraced housing area.

Egremont 

Egremont developed as an affluent residential area in the early 19th century, and was named by one Captain Askew who built a house in the area in 1835 and named it after his Cumberland birthplace.

Seacombe 

Seacombe, the most southeasterly section of Wallasey, is best known for its Mersey Ferry terminal, with regular ferry boat departures to Pier Head in Liverpool and Woodside in Birkenhead. There is a commuter ferry service direct to Liverpool during peak hours, while for the rest of the day the ferries are geared to serving tourists with a circular cruise visiting Birkenhead Woodside ferry terminal as well. Seacombe is the last remaining of the three ferry terminals which used to connect the Borough of Wallasey, the others being Egremont Ferry and the New Brighton Ferry, which operated from its own pier, running parallel to the New Brighton pleasure pier. Seacombe Ferry is also the starting point of a  unbroken promenade, mostly traffic-free, running alongside the River Mersey to Harrison Drive beyond New Brighton.

Local landmarks are St Paul's Church, standing on its own traffic island, and the ventilation tower for the Kingsway Tunnel with its mighty extraction fans. As with Poulton, the area developed with housing for the dockworkers and nearby industries, and much of the housing is owned by Magenta Housing or are terraced. The Guinea Gap swimming baths are located between Seacombe and Egremont.

Education
When compared to the national average, the schools of Wallasey slightly underperform on GCSE results. However they are above the national average on A Level results.

Primary schools 

Egremont Primary School
Greenleas Primary School
Kingsway Primary School
Liscard Primary School
Mount Primary School
New Brighton Primary School
Park Primary School
Riverside Primary School
St Albans Catholic Primary School
St George's Primary School
St Joseph's Catholic Primary School
Saints Peter and Paul Catholic Primary School
Somerville Primary School

Secondary schools 
The Kingsway Academy (in Leasowe)
The Mosslands School
The Oldershaw Academy
St Mary's Catholic College
Weatherhead High School
St Georges Secondary Modern School

Voluntary aided schools 

St Alban's Catholic Primary School
St Joseph's Catholic Primary School
Saints Peter and Paul Catholic Primary School
St Mary's Catholic College

Transport

Road

 The Kingsway Tunnel was opened by Queen Elizabeth II when it was completed in 1971. Its roadway route via Poulton leads to its entrance in Seacombe, which links Wallasey with the centre of Liverpool. It was featured in the film Harry Potter and the Deathly Hallows - Part 1.
 The M53 motorway begins in Poulton; it leads south through the centre of the Wirral Peninsula to Chester and into the M56 motorway, which continues to Manchester Airport.
 The North Wallasey Approach Road begins in Wallasey Village and ends in Bidston at junction 1 of the M53.
 Leasowe Road gives access to Leasowe and Moreton to the west, and to Wallasey Village to the east.

Railway

The town has three railway stations: Wallasey Village, Wallasey Grove Road and New Brighton. Electric trains to Liverpool and Birkenhead generally depart every 15 minutes; this reduces to every 30 minutes during late evenings and on Sundays. Grove Road station has a large car park with over 160 spaces.

Bus
Until 1969, Wallasey had its own corporation bus service; from this date, the operation was taken over by Merseyside Passenger Transport Executive. The Wallasey bus service was relatively constrained within the borough boundaries and had two distinctive features. One was the unusual livery, which appeared to be two shades of yellow (officially it was "sea green" and rich cream, but it always looked yellow and the service was generally known as the "yellow buses"). Secondly the services mostly radiated from Seacombe Ferry terminal across the borough and bus departures coincided with the arrival of the ferry. Vehicles were lined up facing outwards from the kerb and, every 10–15 minutes, the passengers (several hundreds at peak hours) would arrive from the ferry boat. When all had boarded their respective routes, the inspector in charge would blow a whistle and there would be an amazing Le Mans-style start with up to fifteen double-decker buses, including racing engines, close manoeuvring and competitive gestures between the crews for the first few hundred yards until the routes gradually diverged across the borough.

Now, regular bus services (Arriva North West routes 432 and 433) depart Liscard every 10 minutes and travel via the Kingsway Tunnel to Liverpool. In addition, there are several services which link the districts of Wallasey and nearby towns such as Birkenhead, Leasowe and Moreton.

Notable people 

The following people were from Wallasey:

 Mabel Esther Allan (1915–1998), children's author 
 John Baker (1901–1985), structural engineer and inventor of the Morrison indoor shelter
 Shirley Ballas (b. 1960), dancer
 Ann Bell (b. 1938), actress
 Peter Benson (1943–2018), actor
 Elizabeth Berrington, (b. 1970), actress
 Samuel John "Lamorna" Birch (1869–1955), painter
 Jayne Casey (b. 1956), singer (member of Big In Japan)
 Michael Carson (b. 1946), writer
 Walter McLennan Citrine, Baron Citrine, GBE, PC (1887–1983), trade unionist and politician
 Heather Couper (1949–2020), astronomer and broadcaster
 Charles Crichton (1910–1999), film director (The Lavender Hill Mob, A Fish Called Wanda)
 Neil Cross (b. 1972), cricketer
 Dickie Davies (1933–2023), TV sports journalist and presenter
 Louise Delamere (b. 1969), actress
 General Sir Miles Dempsey (1896–1969), commander of the British Second Army during the D-Day landings
 Frank Doel (1908–1968), bookseller in London, whose story is told in 84 Charing Cross Road
 Jenny Frost (b. 1978), singer (member of Atomic Kitten)
 Maxwell Fry, (1899–1987), modernist architect
 Shaun Garnett (b. 1969), Tranmere Rovers footballer and coach
 Sidonie Goossens (1899–2004), harpist
 Leslie Graham (1911–1953), world champion motorcycle racer
 Robbie Green (b. 1974), Professional darts player
 Deryck Guyler (1914–1999), actor and comedian
 Austin Healey (b. 1973), Leicester and England Rugby Union player
 Annie Higdon (1864–1946) Schoolteacher and social activist
 Paul Hollywood (b. 1966), TV personality, baker
 Geoffrey Hughes (1944–2012), actor
 Rita Hunter CBE (1933–2001), opera singer

 Eric Idle (b. 1943), Monty Python legend
 Hetty King (1883–1972), music hall performer
 Saunders Lewis (1893–1985), Welsh nationalist politician and writer
 Jackie Lomax (1944–2013), singer-songwriter
 Malcolm Lowry (1909–1957), writer (Under the Volcano)
 Wilfrid Lowry (1900–1974), Birkenhead Park FC and England rugby union player
 Frances Macdonald (1914–2002), painter
 Donald McMorran (1904–1965), New Classical architect
 John Mungo-Park (1918–1941), wartime flying ace
 Tom Murphy (b. 1949), sculptor
 Raymond Moore, (1920–1987), photographer
 Tyler Morton, (b. 2002), Liverpool F.C. footballer
 Nigel Olsson (b. 1949), rock drummer (Elton John)
 Fred Perry (1909–1995), Wimbledon tennis champion
 Dominic Purcell (b. 1970), actor
 The Boo Radleys (formed 1988), Alternative rock band
 Brian Reece (1913–1962), actor
 Simon Rimmer (b. 1963), Chef, TV Presenter
 Alan Rouse (1951–1986), mountaineer
 Matthew Smith (b. 1966), Games Programmer, creator of Manic Miner
 Jay Spearing (b. 1988), Blackpool F.C. footballer
 Olaf Stapledon (1886–1950), science fiction writer and philosopher
 Graham Stark (1922–2013), actor
 Ralph Steadman (b. 1936), artist and cartoonist
 Ray Stubbs (b. 1956), TV sports presenter
 Major Bill Tilman, CBE, DSO, MC and Bar (1898–1977), mountaineer and explorer
 Victor Tindall (1928–2010), England rugby player
 Peter Watson (b. 1952), photographer 
 Aeneas Francon Williams, FRSGS (1886–1971), Minister of the Church of Scotland, Missionary, Chaplain, writer, poet
 R.J. P. (Bob) Williams (1926–2015), inorganic chemist
 Fortunatus Wright (1712–1757), privateer

See also

Listed buildings in Wallasey
Wallasey power station

References

Bibliography

External links

 
Towns in Merseyside
Towns and villages in the Metropolitan Borough of Wirral
Unparished areas in Merseyside
Populated coastal places in Merseyside